Hebecarpa is a genus of flowering plants belonging to the family Polygalaceae. Species are found from the southern United States (Arizona, Texas and New Mexico) through Mexico and Central America to western South America.

Species
, Plants of the World Online accepted the following species:

Hebecarpa americana (Mill.) J.R.I.Wood & S.Beck
Hebecarpa barbeyana (Chodat) J.R.Abbott
Hebecarpa buxifolia (Kunth) J.R.Abbott & J.F.B.Pastore
Hebecarpa caracasana (Kunth) J.R.Abbott & J.F.B.Pastore
Hebecarpa costaricensis (Chodat) J.R.Abbott & J.F.B.Pastore
Hebecarpa hebantha (Benth.) J.R.Abbott & J.F.B.Pastore
Hebecarpa macradenia (A.Gray) J.R.Abbott
Hebecarpa myrtilloides (Willd.) J.R.Abbott & J.F.B.Pastore
Hebecarpa obscura (Benth.) J.R.Abbott
Hebecarpa ovatifolia (A.Gray) J.R.Abbott
Hebecarpa palmeri (S.Watson) J.R.Abbott
Hebecarpa platycarpa (Benth.) J.R.Abbott & J.F.B.Pastore
Hebecarpa punctata (Humb. ex Schult.) J.R.Abbott & J.F.B.Pastore
Hebecarpa rectipilis (S.F.Blake) J.R.Abbott
Hebecarpa rivinifolia (Kunth) J.R.Abbott & J.F.B.Pastore
Hebecarpa robinsonii (S.F.Blake) J.R.Abbott & J.F.B.Pastore
Hebecarpa rossychaveziae J.R.I.Wood & S.Beck
Hebecarpa tehuacana (Brandegee) J.R.Abbott & J.F.B.Pastore
Hebecarpa velutina (C.Presl) J.R.Abbott & J.F.B.Pastore

References

Polygalaceae
Fabales genera
Flora of Arizona
Flora of Texas
Flora of New Mexico
Flora of Mexico
Flora of Central America
Flora of western South America